The Federal Medical-Biological Agency  or FMBA is the national public health institute of the Russian Federation. The agency is a federal agency under the Ministry of Health and is headquartered in Volokolamsk Highway, in Moscow.

The FMBA was known previously as Federal Directorate for Biomedical and Extremal problems until October 11, 2004, when it was renamed into the current name. During the Soviet regime, since 1947, the Third Main Directorate of the Health Care ministry was responsible for such duties.

Today, its main goal is to protect public health and safety through the control and prevention of disease, injury, and disability. The Agency (FMBA) focuses national attention on developing and applying disease control and prevention. It especially focuses its attention on infectious disease, food borne pathogens, environmental health, occupational safety and health, health promotion, injury prevention and educational activities designed to improve the health of Russian citizens. In addition, the FMBA researches and provides information on non-infectious diseases. The agency is also responsible for the Russian blood bank.

Structure 
 The FMBA Blood Center
 Central Medical-Sanitation Unit No. 1, responsible for medical help for Baikonur Cosmodrome workers.
 Directorate for Inspection and control over epidemic and sanitary security 
 Directorate for organization of science research.
 Main Bureau for medical and social expertise
 Rosplasma - Russian medicine scientific center for blood plasma.

Management 
 Director: Veronika Skvortsova
 Deputy Director: Vladimir Romanov
 Deputy Director: Vyacheslav Rogozhnikov
 Deputy Director: Andrey Sereda
 Deputy Director: Yulia Miroshnikova
 Deputy Director: Irina Fadeyeva

See also
 Federal Service for Surveillance on Consumer Rights Protection and Human Wellbeing (Rospotrebnadzor)

References

External links 
 Official website 
 FMBA Blood Center 
 Rosplasma 

Government agencies established in 1947
Medical research institutes in Russia
Government agencies of Russia
Public health organizations
Medical research institutes in the Soviet Union